Androlaelaps fahrenholzi is a species of mite in the genus Androlaelaps of the family Laelapidae. It occurs throughout the contiguous United States, where it has been recorded on the following mammals:
 Arborimus albipes
 Arborimus longicaudus
 Bassariscus astutus
 Blarina brevicauda
 Blarina carolinensis
 Callospermophilus lateralis
 Chaetodipus hispidus
 Condylura cristata
 Corynorhinus townsendii
 Cryptotis parva
 Cynomys ludovicianus
 Didelphis virginiana
 Dipodomys elator
 Dipodomys elephantinus
 Dipodomys ordii
 Dipodomys venustus
 Geomys pinetis
 Glaucomys sabrinus
 Glaucomys volans
 Lemmiscus curtatus
 Marmota monax
 Mephitis mephitis
 Microtus chrotorrhinus
 Ictidomys tridecemlineatus
 Microtus longicaudus
 Microtus montanus
 Microtus ochrogaster
 Microtus oregoni
 Microtus pennsylvanicus
 Microtus pinetorum
 Microtus richardsoni
 Microtus townsendii
 Mus musculus
 Mustela erminea
 Mustela frenata
 Mustela nivalis
 Myodes californicus
 Myodes gapperi
 Napaeozapus insignis
 Neofiber alleni
 Neotamias amoenus
 Neotamias minimus
 Neotoma cinerea
 Neotoma floridana
 Neotoma fuscipes
 Neotoma lepida
 Neotoma magister
 Neotoma micropus
 Neovison vison
 Neurotrichus gibbsii
 Ochrotomys nuttalli
 Ondatra zibethicus
 Onychomys leucogaster
 Otospermophilus beecheyi
 Oryzomys palustris
 Parascalops breweri
 Perognathus fasciatus
 Perognathus parvus
 Peromyscus boylii
 Peromyscus crinitus
 Peromyscus gossypinus
 Peromyscus leucopus
 Peromyscus maniculatus
 Peromyscus truei
 Podomys floridanus
 Poliocitellus franklinii
 Procyon lotor
 Rattus norvegicus
 Reithrodontomys megalotis
 Scalopus aquaticus
 Scapanus latimanus
 Scapanus orarius
 Scapanus townsendii
 Sciurus carolinensis
 Sciurus niger
 Sigmodon hispidus
 Sorex bendirii
 Sorex cinereus
 Sorex fumeus
 Sorex longirostris
 Sorex pacificus
 Sorex palustris
 Sorex trowbridgii
 Sorex vagrans
 Spilogale putorius
 Sylvilagus floridanus
 Sylvilagus palustris
 Synaptomys borealis
 Synaptomys cooperi
 Tamias striatus
 Tamiasciurus hudsonicus
 Taxidea taxus
 Thomomys talpoides
 Urocitellus beldingi
 Urocitellus brunneus
 Urocitellus richardsonii
 Urocitellus townsendii
 Urocitellus washingtoni
 Urocyon cinereoargenteus
 Xerospermophilus tereticaudus
 Zapus hudsonius
 Zapus princeps
 Zapus trinotatus

See also
List of parasites of the marsh rice rat

References

Literature cited
Whitaker, J.O., Walters, B.L., Castor, L.K., Ritzi, C.M. and Wilson, N. 2007. Host and distribution lists of mites (Acari), parasitic and phoretic, in the hair or on the skin of North American wild mammals north of Mexico: records since 1974. Faculty Publications from the Harold W. Manter Laboratory of Parasitology, University of Nebraska, Lincoln 1:1–173.

Laelapidae
Animals described in 1911
Arthropods of the United States